{{safesubst:#invoke:RfD||2=Ketchup chips|month = March
|day =  3
|year = 2023
|time = 00:19
|timestamp = 20230303001956

|content=
redirect Potato chip#Regional varieties 

}}